Stuart J. Youngner is Professor of Bioethics and Psychiatry at Case Western Reserve University School of Medicine.

He received his BA from Swarthmore. and his MD from Case, where he also  did an internship in pediatrics and a residency in psychiatry. Youngner subsequently studied bioethics  at the Kennedy Institute of Ethics at Georgetown University. He is certified by the American Board of Psychiatry and Neurology.  He is a nationally and internationally recognized scholar in the areas of definitions of death, ethics of organ transplantation and procurement, clinical ethics consultation, and end-of-life decision making.

He has served as a consultant to the Pontifical Academy of Sciences, the  Office of Technology Assessment of the U.S. Congress, the Robert Wood Johnson Foundation, and the U. S. Institute of Medicine of the National Academy of Sciences. He was co-director of the national task force on Standards in ethics evaluation. 
He is on the editorial boards  of the Journal of Medicine and Philosophy, the Kennedy Institute of Ethics Journal, and the Journal of Law, Medicine and Ethics.

He is the editor or coeditor of eleven books; his latest book is The Oxford Handbook on Death and Dying. New York: Oxford University 2016. He has written over 100 peer reviewed journal articles..

Honors
Fellow of the Hastings Center
Fellow of the American Psychiatric Association
President of the Society for Bioethics Consultation, 1994–1997
Founding member of the American Society for Bioethics and Humanities
Distinguished Service Award, American Society for Bioethics and Humanities. 2000
President, Society for Health and Human Values 1994-9
President, The Association for Bioethics Program Directors 2014-2016

Publications

Books
Transplanting Human Tissue: Ethics, Policy and Practice,   Oxford University Press, 2003. 
Review, by Mark A. Rothstein 2006. The American Journal of Bioethics 6(3):76 review
The Definition of Death: Contemporary Controversies (Johns Hopkins University Press).
Ethics Consultation: From Theory to Practice with Mark P. Aulisio, Robert M. Arnold   2003
The Definition of Death: Contemporary Controversies ed., with  Robert M. Arnold, and Renie Schapiro, Johns Hopkins University Press, 1999.  
End-Of-Life Decisions: A Psychological Perspective ed. with Maurice Steinberg and), Stuart J. Younger. American Psychiatric Pub Group, `1998.  
Review, by Terry Rabinowitz, Psychosomatics 40:3, May–June 1999 full text
Organ Transplantation: Meanings and Realities ed., with   Renée C. Fox, and Laurence J. O'Connell University of Wisconsin Press, 1996.

External links
 Faculty web page

Living people
Year of birth missing (living people)
American psychiatrists
Bioethicists
Academic staff of the University of Salamanca
Case Western Reserve University faculty
Swarthmore College alumni
Case Western Reserve University alumni
Georgetown University alumni
Hastings Center Fellows